This is a list of awards and nominations received by Super Junior, a South Korean boy band formed in 2005 by SM Entertainment. Super Junior has won numerous awards and recognitions since their K-pop debut in 2005, their introduction to the Mandopop industry in 2007 and to the J-pop industry in 2011. Super Junior won most of their awards in South Korea, but they have also won many awards and nominations globally. The group has recorded ten studio albums and seven CD singles, but they have released a total of 20 different kinds of records, including featurings and sub-unit recordings.

The band's most successful song is U, which earned Super Junior their first music award, the SBS Popular Songs Mutizen Song in June 2006. The single earned the band four more distinctive song awards, and the band grabbed their first MKMF award from the Mnet/KM Music Festival in November 2006. In terms of recognition in other areas of Asia, Super Junior is the first overseas artist to win Asia's Artist of the Year at the Tencent Stars Magnificent Ceremony in China, and is also the second musical group to win Favorite Artist Korea at the MTV Asia Awards, after jtL in 2003. Super Junior have earned 20 music awards at the Golden Disc Awards, 13 at the Mnet Asian Music Awards and 13 at the Seoul Music Awards. Super Junior is the first Asian artist who won International Artist at the 2015 Teen Choice Awards.

Super Junior won Legend Award a special title at the Asia Artist Awards in November 2017 and also won Top of K-Pop Record in November 2019 due to their prominent contributions in Korean Wave, leading K-pop to its current state of global awareness. In January 2019, the band won "Artist of the Year Award" at the 14th KKBOX Music Awards in Taiwan and became the first non-Chinese artist to receive it.

Super Junior have also gained recognition for their dress style and fashion throughout their career. They hailed as the best-dressed artist at the 2007 Summer Break 20's Choice Awards, and also earned a similar nomination the following year. The group have also earned titles for their dance choreography and popularity.

Awards and nominations

Other accolades

State and cultural honors

Listicles

Notes

References 

Awards
Super Junior